Vaughan Transit was the transit provider in the town of Vaughan, in southwest York Region, Ontario, Canada. The service operated from 1973 until 2001, when it was merged into York Region Transit.

Route

Vaughan Transit routes tended to snake around side streets and not in the traditional grid format (north south or west east routing):

 Route 1 Woodbridge (Steeles via Islington) – became YRT route 11
 Route 2 Pine Valley (Steeles to Aberdeen) – became YRT route 12, later merged with route 6
 Route 3 Islington (Steeles to Rutherford) – became YRT route 13
 Route 3A Islington (Steeles to Kleinburg)
 Route 4 Major Mackenzie (Maple to Richmond Hill)
 Route 4A Major Mackenzie (Langstaff to Richmond Hill)
 Route 4B Major Mackenzie (Wonderland to Richmond Hill)
 Route 5 Clark (Glen Shields to Finch Station)
 Route 6 Ansley Grove (Steeles to Langstaff) – later merged with route 2 to form a new YRT route 12.
 Route 7 Martin Grove (Steeles to Highway 27)
 Route 7A Martin Grove (Steeles to Coronation)
 Route 7B Martin Grove (Highway 7 to Highway 27 via Steeles)
 Route 8 New Westminster (Steeles to Bathurst. Extended to York University circa 2001) – YRT route 18, merged with former Markham Transit route 3 to form a YRT route 3
 Route 9 Rutherford – incorporated into YRT route 85
 Route 27 Highway 27 (Steeles to Highway 7)
 Route 46 Maple/Woodbridge (Steeles to Richmond Hill) – restructured, became YRT route 10
 Route 77 Highway 7 via Centre (Finch Station to Brampton)
 Route 77A Highway 7 via Clark (Finch Station to Brampton – Sundays only)
 Route 77E Highway 7 Express

Routes 77, 77A, and 77E were run in conjunction with Brampton Transit.

Information from a November 1999 rollsign transcribed here.

Fleet

Vaughan Transit operated a total of 35 buses:

Current YRT status (2012):

 1977–1981 Ontario Bus Industries Orion I 01.501 (#510–511, #512, #514)
 1986–1987 Ontario Bus Industries Orion I 01.502 (#515-#518)
 1987, 1989 Ontario Bus Industries Orion I 01.508 (#519-#525)
 1989 Ontario Bus Industries Orion V 05.501 (#526-#530)
 1981 Grumman-Flxible 870 (#606, #607)- Ex-Transit Windsor, Ex-Santa Clara County Transit
 General Motors Corporation RTS (#906)
 1981 Grumman-Flxible 870 (#907–909) – Ex-Brantford Public Utilities Commission, Ex-Santa Clara County Transit
 1969 General Motors Diesel Division Buses T6H-5305 (#910) – Ex-Toronto Transit Commission #7330
 1975 General Motors Diesel Division Buses T6H-4523N (#911) – Ex-Brampton Transit #7533
 1977 General Motors Diesel Division Buses T6H-4523N (#912) – Ex-St.John's Transportation Commission #7533
 1979 Flyer Industries D900 (#914, #915) – Ex-Oshawa Transit
 1998 Champion Bus Incorporated Solo (#1006–1008)
 1998 Orion Bus Industries Orion VI 06.501 (#1045–1046) 

There are no original buses running today. The last one retired in November 2011, Which was 1046.

 denotes wheelchair accessibility

Facilities
Vaughan buses were maintained Can-ar Maintenance Facility – Division 4. Buses were stored in two outdoor locations on Creditstone Road and Caldari Road. The facilities were retained by York Region Transit's contractors, who are the same that served for Vaughan Transit.

See also

 Transportation in Vaughan
 Markham Transit
 Richmond Hill Transit
 York Region Transit
 Toronto Transit Commission
 GO Transit
 Viva (bus rapid transit)
 Aurora Transit
 Newmarket Transit

Loops
 Martin Grove Road and Steeles Avenue (shared with TTC)
 Kipling Avenue and Steeles Avenue (shared with TTC)
 Islington Avenue and Steeles Avenue (shared with TTC)

References
 Transit History...Vaughan

Transport in Vaughan
Transit agencies in Ontario
York Region Transit